Saint-Gatien-des-Bois is a commune in the Calvados in the Normandy region in northwestern France.

Climate

Population

See also
Communes of the Calvados department

References

Communes of Calvados (department)
Calvados communes articles needing translation from French Wikipedia